The 2011 Nigerian Senate election in Anambra State was held on April 9, 2011, to elect members of the Nigerian Senate to represent Anambra State. John Emeka Okey representing Anambra North, and Andy Ubah representing Anambra South both won on the platform of the People's Democratic Party. While Chris Ngige representing Anambra Central won on the platform of the Action Congress of Nigeria.

Overview

Summary

Results

Anambra Central 
The three major parties Action Congress of Nigeria, All Progressives Grand Alliance and People's Democratic Party registered with the Independent National Electoral Commission to contest in the election. ACN Chris Ngige won the election, defeating PDP candidate Ogugua Okoye, APGA candidate Dora Akunyili and other party candidates.

Anambra South 
The three major parties Action Congress of Nigeria, All Progressives Grand Alliance and People's Democratic Party registered with the Independent National Electoral Commission to contest in the election. PDP candidate Andy Ubah won the election, defeating, APGA candidate Chukwuma Nzeribe, ACN Chris Atuegbu and other party candidates.

Anambra North 
The three major parties Action Congress of Nigeria, All Progressives Grand Alliance and People's Democratic Party registered with the Independent National Electoral Commission to contest in the election. PDP candidate John Emeka Okey won the election, defeating, APGA candidate Joy Emordi, ACN J Balohun and other party candidates.

References 

April 2011 events in Nigeria
Anambra State Senate elections
2011 Nigerian Senate elections